Prana Malla  (Nepal Bhasa:) was a Malla Dynasty King of Bhaktapur, Nepal from 1519 to 1547. Unlike many of the other Malla rulers, there is little evidence today that this king was particularly active in construction developments in the Durbar Square in Bhaktapur.

References

Malla rulers of Bhaktapur
1547 deaths
Year of birth unknown
16th-century Nepalese people